Crassula brevifolia is a succulent plant native to the arid western edge of South Africa (including the Namaqualand, as far south as Vanrhynsdorp) as well as southern Namibia.

Description
A small (reaching 50cm in height), branching, perennial shrub. 

It has distinctively short, thickly-succulent leaves, which are roughly triangular in cross-section but with slightly rounded angles (leaf-margins). 
It has flaking brown bark on its thin, woody stems.

Variation
This is a very variable species, with two subspecies and many regional forms. 

 subsp. brevifolia. The type subsp. grows on exposed quartzitic or granite outcrops, from Namibia to as far south as Vanrhynsdorp. It has papillate ovaries (each with 18-24 ovules), and the leaves usually point upwards, between visible internodes. 
 subsp. psammophila. A rarer subspecies that favours flatter sands or gravels near the Orange River in the Northern Cape Province.

Related species
This species is closely related to Crassula rupestris and Crassula perforata.

References

brevifolia
Flora of the Cape Provinces
Plants described in 1862